Chumathang is a village in Leh District, Ladakh in northern India on the banks of the Indus river. chumathang village is among the first villages in the changthang region to have its own power station and government high school which was only possible under the guidance of Mr Gonbo. Famous for its hot spring which attracts many tourists all over the world, even the local people come every year to take the medicinal benifits from the hot spring. It tends to cure many old age related health issues.
There is an old monastery or gonpa which is located near the road which is about more than 400 years old and is among the oldest monasteries of ladakh.

Location 
Chumathang 138 km (86 miles) southeast of Leh, and 41 km northwest of Nyoma, and 29 km (18 miles) from Kiari, where there is a small medical centre run by the Indian Army.

Demographics
According to the 2011 census of India, Chumathang has 127 households. The effective literacy rate (i.e. the literacy rate of population excluding children aged 6 and below) is 68.03%.

Tourism 

There are a few small dhabas or restaurants here making it a good spot to lunch and visit the hot springs which are about 2 km to the east. There is also a basic guesthouse and small store in the village. Near the hot springs is the Hot Spring Resort which has many basic rooms - one with a hot bath. Chumathang also offers Himalayan homestays which are suitable for those who like to live and take a little peek in a local Ladakhi house and stay there for a day or two.

Travellers coming from the south will find that Chumathang is significantly lower than the Tso Moriri lake, making it a good stop for people suffering from altitude sickness.
Now there are many facilities like 24\7 electricity and 4G network which finally got upgraded in 2022  ending.

Gompa
Behind and above the village is a small village big and a gigantic gompa or monastery. Constructed by the people of the village without any mere use of machine's under the supervision of Gonbo Chemet Dorjey(GC Dorjey).

References

External links
For some information and good photos

Villages in Nyoma tehsil